The Monteoru culture was a Bronze Age archaeological culture located in Romania and Moldova, dating from c. 2000 BC to the 14th century BC. It was derived from the preceding Glina-Schneckenberg culture and succeeded by the Noua-Sabatinovka culture, and was contemporary with the related Tei culture.

According to Anthony (2007), chariotry spread westwards to the Monteoru culture from the Multi-cordoned ware culture.

Gallery

See also
Prehistory of Transylvania
Tei culture
Ottomany culture
Wietenberg culture
Vatya Culture
Unetice culture
Multi-cordoned ware culture

References

Archaeological cultures of Eastern Europe
Bronze Age cultures of Europe
Archaeological cultures in Romania
Archaeological cultures in Moldova